Bortolotto is an Italian surname. Notable people with the surname include:

Claudio Bortolotto (born 1952), Italian cyclist
Mario Bortolotto (born 1957), Australian rules footballer
Roberto Bortolotto (born 1984), Italian footballer

See also
Bortolotti

Italian-language surnames